Single-stranded DNA-binding protein 4 is a protein that in humans is encoded by the SSBP4 gene.

References

Further reading